The 1992 Philippine Basketball Association (PBA) First Conference was the first Conference of the 1992 PBA season. It started on February 9 and ended on May 5, 1992. The tournament requires a 6'5" and below import for each team.

Format
The following format will be observed for the duration of the conference:
The teams were divided into 2 groups.

Group A:
Ginebra San Miguel
Presto Ice Cream
Purefoods TJ Hotdogs
San Miguel Beermen

Group B:
Alaska Milkmen
Pepsi Hotshots
Shell Rimula X Zoomers
Swift Mighty Meaty Hotdogs

Teams in a group will play against each other once and against teams in the other group twice; 11 games per team; Teams are then seeded by basis on win–loss records. Ties are broken among point differentials of the tied teams. Standings will be determined in one league table; teams do not qualify by basis of groupings.
The top five teams after the eliminations will advance to the semifinals.
Semifinals will be two round robin affairs with the remaining teams. Results from the elimination round will be carried over. A playoff incentive for a finals berth will be given to the team that will win at least five of their eight semifinal games.
The top two teams (or the top team and the winner of the playoff incentive) will face each other in a best-of-seven championship series. The next two teams will qualify for a best-of-five playoff for third place.

Elimination round

Team standings

Semifinal berth playoff

Semifinals

Team standings

Cumulative standings

Semifinal round standings:

Finals berth playoff

Third place playoffs

Finals

References

External links
 PBA.ph

PBA First Conference
First Conference